Platygyriella aureoides is a species of moss from the genus Platygyriella. It is found in Africa.

References

Hypnaceae
Plants described in 1984
Taxa named by William Russel Buck